USS Jamaica (CVE-43) (originally AVG-43 then later ACV-43), was an escort carrier of World War II that served in the British Royal Navy as HMS Shah (D21). Returned to the United States at war's end, she was converted into a merchant vessel and she was sold into civilian service in 1946 as Salta. She was ultimately scrapped in 1966.

Design and description
The ships in this class were all larger and had a greater aircraft capacity than all preceding American-built escort carriers. Their hulls were designed as merchant ships but they were laid down as escort carriers and were not later conversions.

Aircraft facilities were a small combined bridge–flight control on the starboard side, two aircraft lifts , one aircraft catapult and nine arrestor wires. Aircraft could be housed in the  hangar below the flight deck. Armament comprised: two 4 inch dual-purpose guns in single mounts, sixteen 40 mm Bofors anti-aircraft guns in twin mounts and twenty 20 mm Oerlikon anti-aircraft cannon in single mounts.
Her operational complement of aircraft carried changed over time, typically being some combination of up to about 18 Grumman Avengers, Grumman Wildcats, Grumman Hellcats, and Supermarine Walrus, plus deck cargo.

Military service as Shah
MC Hull 254 was laid down 13 November 1942 and launched as Jamaica under contract to the Maritime Commission by Seattle-Tacoma Shipbuilding at Tacoma, Washington, on 21 April 1943 sponsored by Mrs. C. T. Simard. She was reclassified CVE-43 on 15 July 1943 and acquired by the United States Navy.

She was transferred to the United Kingdom under lend-lease, commissioning on 27 September 1943, as one of a large group of escort carriers suitable for anti-submarine work transferred to the Royal Navy in the Pacific.

Jamaica was renamed Shah, with a RN pennant number of D21. Commanded by William John Yendell, her initial air complement was 851 Naval Air Squadron with 12 Grumman Avenger II torpedo bombers and a flight of Grumman Wildcat fighters.

After sea trials, she was modified in Canada for convoy defence, this being completed at the end of the year. She sailed from Vancouver for San Francisco to take on her complement of operational aircraft, 12 Grumman Avengers and a flight of Grumman Wildcats. However, no flying was possible as her decks were also filled with Curtiss P-40s to be ferried to Cochin. From San Francisco she sailed to Williamstown, Melbourne, Australia. After resupplying she continued in this configuration to Cochin and Colombo.
 
Her duties were chiefly convoy defence and trade protection against German U-boats operating in the Indian Ocean with a shore base at Trincomalee. She took an active part in the war, heading the hunter-killer group which sank  in the Indian Ocean on 12 August 1944.

Shah was transferred to the East Indies Fleet and then refitted in Durban before taking part in the Burma campaign in 1945. Having suffered several aircraft losses on patrol and landing accidents, her complement was augmented around this time by a flight of Grumman Hellcats. During April and May 1945 she participated in Operation Bishop, launching patrols and strikes against Nicobar preparatory to the invasion of Rangoon.
Soon after, she was tasked with the search for the Japanese cruiser . A serious landing accident by one of those Hellcats effectively removed Shah from operations on 11 May. Nonetheless 851's Avengers, flying from Emperor, were able to locate and damage Haguro, prior to her sinking by the 26th Destroyer Flotilla in Operation Dukedom.

The Hellcats that survived the earlier landing accident were flown off Shah and she briefly returned to Ceylon and Bombay for refitting and training. Collecting surviving Avengers from 851 and 845 Squadrons, plus Hellcats and a Walrus for support and recovery during landing operations, in August she sailed to join Operation Zipper on the Malay coast, only to be stood down en route when Japan capitulated.

Disembarking her aircraft at Trincomalee on 26 August, she then sailed to the Clyde naval base via Aden and the Suez Canal where she was prepared for return to the United States. Arriving at Norfolk on 16 October, she was formally handed over to the United States on 26 November 1945.

Merchant service as Salta
She was sold into merchant service to Argentina on 20 June 1947 as Salta, named after the Argentinian city. The Newport News shipyard performed the conversion.

In 1963 she was the first ship on scene at the rescue of passengers and crew from the Greek liner  when it caught fire in the Atlantic. At the time she was under the command of Captain José Barrere, on its way from Genoa, Italy, to Buenos Aires. Salta rescued 475 people and took aboard most of Lakonias lifeboats. Salta was scrapped in Buenos Aires in 1966.

Notes

References

External links

 History and Photos at royalnavyresearcharchive.org.uk
 Photo gallery at Navsource.org

 

Ships built in Tacoma, Washington
1943 ships
Ruler-class escort carriers
 
Ships of Argentina